Speech (foaled  February 12, 2017) is an American Thoroughbred racehorse and the winner of the 2020 Ashland Stakes.

Career

Speech's first race was on November 15, 2019, at Del Mar Racetrack, where she came in third. Speech picked up her first win in her second start on December 14, 2019, at Los Alamitos Race Course.

She competed in her first stakes race on March 8, 2020, at the Grade-3 Santa Ysabel Stakes and came in 2nd place, behind Donna Veloce. This was Speech's first two-turn race.

Speech's next race was on May 2, 2020, at Oaklawn Park, where she picked up a win in an Allowance Optional Claiming race.

On June 6, 2020, Speech competed in the Grade-2 Santa Anita Oaks. She finished four lengths behind the victor, Swiss Skydiver, but finished over seven lengths ahead of Merneith. The result gave Speech 40 qualification points towards the 2020 Kentucky Oaks.

Speech won the most important race of her career on July 11, 2020, when she captured the Grade-1 Ashland Stakes. She came into the race with 4:1 odds as the third favorite horse and won by 3 lengths in an upset. This victory qualified her for the 2020 Kentucky Oaks.

Pedigree

References

2017 racehorse births